The Romulus was a Téméraire class 74-gun ship of the line of the French Navy.

In February 1814, under captain Rolland, she sailed from Toulon to Genoa, being part of a division under Julien Cosmao. On 13, she was engaged by three British ships of the line, notably HMS Boyne and HMS Caledonia, and managed to escape to Toulon by sailing close to the coast to avoid being surrounded.

By 1821, she had been razéed into a frigate, and renamed Guerrière. She was captained by Commander Jean-Léon Émeric.

She was eventually broken up in 1830.

References

External links 

 Fonds Marine. Campagnes (opérations ; divisions et stations navales ; missions diverses). Inventaire de la sous-série Marine BB4. Tome deuxième : BB4 1 à 482 (1790-1826) 
 JULIEN COSMAO KERJULIEN (1761 – 1825) 

Ships of the line of the French Navy
Téméraire-class ships of the line
1812 ships